Aguadulce is an agricultural city and corregimiento in the Coclé province in Panama. It is the capital of Aguadulce District and it is located on the Pan-American Highway, near but not on the coast on the Bahia de Parita. The name means "sweetwater".

Economy

Aguadulce District is an Industrial Zone  dedicated to process cane sugar, rice, animal feed, shrimp, and salt production via evaporation of sea water. The water is allowed to enter fields at high tide; its exit is then blocked, and evaporation caused by the sun leaves sea salt, which is then gathered and packaged, along with seafood for export to other markets abroad. Other activities are entertainment activities in casinos, agricultural activities, commerce and restaurants.

Some significant infrastructure in Aguadulce district are Aguadulce Port, Aguadulce airport, Salao Beach. It can be mentioned that there is also offices of the Ministerio de Trabajo, Organo Judicial, Juzgado Municipal Civil, along with those of both Penal and Public Ministries.

Arts

CENTRO DE ESTUDIOS SUPERIORES DE BELLAS ARTES  teaches courses for children and adults in the areas of painting, sculpture, ballet, theater, music. In addition, students can aspire to a fine arts technician who can continue studying at the university to obtain a bachelor's degree.
It can be  seen a breakthrough in culture since music has been supported by Aguadulce Youth Symphony Orchestra, which has been presented in many cultural activities nationwide.

Places to Visit 

The District has plains as well as hills. At El Salao there is a beach. In the area of El Rompio there is a cove.

Visitors also will enjoy:

Aguadulce's Founding Anniversary, during October, with a traditional parade on Sunday.
Festival of Saint John, in June, with a religious parade, traditional parade, and nightlife activities.
Carnivals, including both day and night parades, stage performances, and nightlife activities. 
Easter Week, a traditional drama theatre of a Jesucrist Passion Play, religious parade, and activities on each day.
Christmas parade

Sources

External links

http://www.chitrenet.net/aguadulce.html

Populated places in Coclé Province
Corregimientos of Coclé Province